Load is the sixth studio album by American heavy metal band Metallica, released on June 4, 1996, by Elektra Records in the United States and by Vertigo Records internationally. The album showed more of a hard rock side of Metallica than the band's typical thrash metal style, which alienated much of the band's fanbase. It also featured influences from genres such as Southern rock, blues rock, country rock, and alternative rock. Drummer Lars Ulrich said about Load more exploratory nature, "This album and what we're doing with it – that, to me, is what Metallica are all about: exploring different things. The minute you stop exploring, then just sit down and fucking die." At 79 minutes, Load is Metallica's longest studio album.

Load received mixed reviews from critics but was a commercial success, debuting and spending four consecutive weeks at number one on the US Billboard 200 chart. Load sold 680,000 units in its first week, making it the biggest opening week for Metallica as well as the biggest debut of 1996. It was certified 5× platinum by the Recording Industry Association of America (RIAA) for shipping five million copies in the United States. Four singles—"Until It Sleeps", "Hero of the Day", "Mama Said", and "King Nothing"—were released as part of the marketing campaign for the album.

Background
Load, released approximately five years after the commercially successful album Metallica, saw the band shifting toward hard rock and away from their thrash metal roots. As on previous releases, the album's fourteen songs began as rough demos created by principal songwriters James Hetfield and Lars Ulrich in Ulrich's basement recording studio, "The Dungeon". In early 1995, the band took over thirty demos into The Plant Studios, where they would work for approximately one year. Metallica worked with producer Bob Rock, who had been at the helm during the recording process for Metallica.

The songwriting dispensed almost entirely with the thrash metal style that characterized the band's sound in the 1980s. Metallica had listed several artists and bands from which they took inspiration while writing Load and Reload, including Kyuss, Alice in Chains, Soundgarden, Primus, ZZ Top, Pantera, Corrosion of Conformity, Ted Nugent, Aerosmith, and even more mainstream acts like Oasis, Alanis Morissette, and Garth Brooks, among others. This resulted in Load having a much more mid-paced, groovier sound. In place of staccato riffs, Hetfield and lead guitarist Kirk Hammett experimented with blues rock-based tones and styles. Additionally, Ulrich adopted a minimalist approach to his drum recording, abandoning the speed and complex double bass drumming patterns of previous albums, and using simpler techniques and playing styles. 

The album's lyrical themes show a striking departure from Metallica's previously social and politically charged subjects; many of Load's tracks discuss themes of depression, including "Bleeding Me", "Mama Said", and "Until It Sleeps", all of which are about the death of Hetfield's mother, and "The Outlaw Torn", which is said to be about the band coping with Cliff Burton's death. Other songs, such as "The House Jack Built" and "Cure", discuss themes of drug and alcohol addiction, and "Thorn Within" and "Poor Twisted Me" reflect James's struggles with depression.

Hammett, encouraged by producer Bob Rock, also played rhythm guitar on a Metallica album for the first time, having previously only played lead parts with Hetfield playing all the rhythm parts to achieve a tighter feel, in contrast to the looser feel they were looking for here.  Hammett continued playing rhythm until Death Magnetic when Hetfield once again played all the rhythm parts.

At 79 minutes, Load is Metallica's longest studio album. With the CD length at 78:59, initial pressings of the album were affixed with stickers boasting of its long playtime, simply reading "78:59". "The Outlaw Torn" had to be shortened by about one minute to fit on the album; the full version of the track was released on the single "The Memory Remains" as "The Outlaw Torn (Unencumbered by Manufacturing Restrictions Version)", with a running time of 10:48. An explanation on the single's back cover stated:

Load was Metallica's first album on which all tracks were down-tuned to E♭ tuning. Hammett states:

The band had recorded songs on earlier albums in tunings lower than E: "The God That Failed" (Metallica) was in E♭, and "Sad but True" (Metallica) and "The Thing That Should Not Be" (Master of Puppets) were in D tuning. Hetfield also felt that the change to E♭ was a bonus, as it was easier to perform string bends in the riffs.

The Australian CD release of Load includes a bonus interview CD that is unavailable elsewhere. 10 songs from the album have been played live including "King Nothing", "Until It Sleeps", "Ain't My Bitch", "Bleeding Me", "Wasting My Hate", "Hero of the Day", "The Outlaw Torn", "2 X 4", "Poor Twisted Me", "Mama Said". Songs that have not been played live in their entirety are "The House Jack Built", "Cure", "Thorn Within", and "Ronnie".

Artwork
The cover of Load is an original artwork titled "Semen and Blood III". It is one of three photographic studies that Andres Serrano created in 1990 by mingling bovine blood and his own semen between two sheets of Plexiglas. The liner notes simply state "cover art by Andres Serrano" rather than listing the title of the work. Hammett learned of Serrano's work from Godflesh frontman Justin Broadrick when he was shown the music video Serrano had directed for the Godflesh song "Crush My Soul". Broadrick claimed that no one in Metallica knew about Serrano before the "Crush My Soul" music video. 

In a 2009 interview with Classic Rock, Hetfield expressed his dislike of the album cover and its inspiration:

Load also marked the first appearance of a new Metallica logo that rounded off the stabbing edges of the band's earlier logo, greatly simplifying its appearance. The M from the original logo was used to make a shuriken-like symbol known as the "ninja star", which was used as an alternate logo on this and future albums, and on related artwork. The album featured an expansive booklet containing photographs by Anton Corbijn. These photographs depict the band in various dress, including white A-shirts with suspenders, Cuban suits, and gothic. In the aforementioned 2009 interview, James Hetfield said:

Reception

Load received mixed to positive reviews from critics. Rolling Stone said, "The foursome dams the bombast and chugs half-speed ahead, settling into a wholly magnetizing groove that bridges old-school biker rock and the doomier side of post-grunge '90s rock." Q enthused, "These boys set up their tents in the darkest place of all, in the naked horror of their own heads... Metallica make existential metal and they've never needed the props... Metallica are still awesome... What is new is streamlined attack, the focus and, yes, the tunes."

Melody Maker expressed reservations about Loads heaviness compared to its predecessors: "A Metallica album is traditionally an exhausting event. It should rock you to exhaustion, leave you brutalised and drained. This one is no exception. It is, however, the first Metallica album to make me wonder at any point, 'What the fuck was that?' It's as if the jackboot grinding the human face were to take occasional breaks for a pedicure." AllMusic considered Load repetitive, uninteresting and poorly executed. In The Village Voice, Robert Christgau said "this is just a metal record with less solo room, which is good because it concentrates their chops, and more singing, which isn't because they can't."

"Some of that stuff was pretty cool," remarked Lars Ulrich of the album and its sequel. "With Load, it was disappointing that some people's reaction to the music was biased by how they dealt with the pictures – the hair and all that crap [see Artwork, above]. People have come up to me years afterwards and said, 'I never gave the record a fair chance because I couldn't get beyond Jason Newsted wearing eyeliner.' But 'The Outlaw Torn', some of that shit is pretty fucking awesome."

Track listing

Personnel
Credits are adapted from the album's liner notes.Metallica James Hetfield – vocals, rhythm guitar, lead guitar on "2 X 4", "The House Jack Built", "King Nothing", "Thorn Within" and "The Outlaw Torn"
 Kirk Hammett – lead and rhythm guitar
 Jason Newsted – bass
 Lars Ulrich – drumsProduction'

 Bob Rock – production
 Brian Dobbs – engineering, mixing
 Randy Staub – engineering
 Jason Goldstein – assistant engineering
 Kent Matcke – assistant engineering
 Mike Fraser – mixing
 Matt Curry – mixing assistant
 Mike Rew – mixing assistant
 George Marino – mastering
 Paul DeCarli – digital editing
 Mike Gillies – digital editing assistant
 Chris Vrenna – digital editing assistant
 Andie Airfix – design
 Andres Serrano – cover design
 Anton Corbijn – photography

Charts

Weekly charts

Year-end charts

Decade-end charts

Certifications

References

External links

1996 albums
Metallica albums
Albums produced by Bob Rock
Elektra Records albums
Vertigo Records albums